Horton Park is a public park in Bradford, England, located to the west of the city in Great Horton.
It was opened on 25 May 1878 on land purchased by Bradford Council in 1873.
The park was designed by William Gay landscape gardener and surveyor.

The park provides bowling greens, and a children's play area, as well as floral decorations.
Bradford Council retain ownership of the park but, the park is primarily looked after by Glendale on contract.
The bowling greens are open to the public from April to September each year.
Vehicular access to the park is by permit only.

References

External links 

 Bradford Parks & Landscape Services

Horton Park